Giovanni Antonio Amato or Amati (c. 1475–1555) was an Italian painter of the Renaissance period. Born in Naples, he copied the style of Pietro Perugino.

He was also called il Vecchio. He followed the style of Pietro Perugino, and among his pupils were Giovanni Vincenzo Corso, Giovanni Bernardo Lama, Battista Loca, Pietro Negroni, Simone il Giovane Papa, and Cesare Turco. His nephew, Giovanni Antonio di Amato the younger married the painter Mariangiola Criscuolo.

Another painter named Giovanni Antonio D’Amato was active in Baroque Naples. He painted a Vergine Lauretana for the church of Santa Maria del Popolo agli Incurabili and the Vision of San Romualdo for the ceiling of the choir of the Eremo dei Camaldoli. He painted a Santi Nicola, Domenico e Gennaro, now in the museo civico. He also painted a Deposition and Holy family in the church of the Gerolamini. The relationship of these two painters is unclear.

References

1475 births
1555 deaths
15th-century Italian painters
Italian male painters
16th-century Italian painters
Painters from Naples
Renaissance painters